Pratt's is a gentlemen's club in London, England.  It was established in 1857, with premises in a house in Park Place, off St James's Street, and close to the Ritz.

History
The club takes its name from William Nathaniel Pratt, who lived there from 1841.  Pratt was steward to the Duke of Beaufort, who called at the house with his friends one evening, and enjoyed themselves so much that they returned time and again.  After Pratt's death in 1860, the club was continued by his widow, Sophia, and son, Edwin.

The premises were later acquired by the 11th Duke of Devonshire.

It has around 600 members, but only 14 can dine at one time at the single table in the basement dining room. The club has two rooms: a dining room, and a sitting room/smoking room. Also housed in the premises is a billiard room (which is primarily used for guests to hang their coats on the chairs), a larger dining room used for lunches or private parties, a small suite that members are required to book well in advance, and the steward's quarters above.

As the building is heritage-listed (certain parts of it date back to the 16th century), there is no air conditioning, nor is there a lift; there are roughly 100 stairs from the basement club to the steward's quarters.

To avoid confusion, all male staff members are referred to as 'George'.

Notable members
Notable members have included Charles Wyndham, Harold Macmillan, Randolph Churchill, Duncan Sandys and the cartoonist Osbert Lancaster, who featured the armchair and stuffed fish in the members lounge in many of his cartoons.

See also
List of London's gentlemen's clubs
Blades Club

References

From: 'Park Place, South Side', Survey of London: volumes 29 and 30: St James Westminster, Part 1 (1960), pp. 542–45. URL: http://www.british-history.ac.uk/report.asp?compid=40627. Date accessed: 26 September 2007.
The Arts of Cheerfulness. URL: http://www.johnderbyshire.com/Opinions/Straggler/089.html (Final paragraph is an anecdote about Michael Heseltine being blackballed by Pratt's members)

Gentlemen's clubs in London
1857 establishments in England